Aspidoscelis guttatus, the Mexican racerunner, is a species of teiid lizard endemic to Mexico.

References

guttatus
Reptiles described in 1834
Taxa named by Arend Friedrich August Wiegmann
Reptiles of Mexico
Taxobox binomials not recognized by IUCN